Vacharaporn Munkit (born 2 July 1987) also known as Punyada Munkitchokecharoen, Peeraya Munkitamorn is a Thai badminton player. In 2009, she competed at the Southeast Asian Games and won two bronze medals in the women's doubles and team event. Munkit also won 2010 Asian Championships bronze in the women's doubles event, and Asian Games silver in the women's team event.

Achievements

Asian Championships 
Women's doubles

Southeast Asian Games 
Women's doubles

BWF Grand Prix 
The BWF Grand Prix has two level such as Grand Prix and Grand Prix Gold. It is a series of badminton tournaments, sanctioned by Badminton World Federation (BWF) since 2007.

Women's doubles

 BWF Grand Prix Gold tournament
 BWF Grand Prix tournament

BWF International Challenge/Series
Mixed doubles

 BWF International Challenge tournament
 BWF International Series tournament

References

External links
 

1987 births
Living people
Vacharaporn Munkit
Badminton players at the 2010 Asian Games
Vacharaporn Munkit
Asian Games medalists in badminton
Medalists at the 2010 Asian Games
Competitors at the 2009 Southeast Asian Games
Vacharaporn Munkit
Southeast Asian Games medalists in badminton
Vacharaporn Munkit